Dicromantispa is a genus of mantidflies in the family Mantispidae. There are about 10 described species in Dicromantispa.

Species
These 10 species belong to the genus Dicromantispa:
 Dicromantispa debilis (Gerstaecker, 1888)
 Dicromantispa electromexicana Engel & Grimaldi, 2007
 Dicromantispa gracilis (Erichson, 1839)
 Dicromantispa hyalina Pires Machado & Rafael, 2010
 Dicromantispa interrupta (Say, 1825)
 Dicromantispa leucophaea Pires Machado & Rafael, 2010
 Dicromantispa moronei Engel & Grimaldi, 2007
 Dicromantispa moulti (Navás, 1909)
 Dicromantispa sayi (Banks, 1897)
 Dicromantispa synapsis Hoffman in Penny, 2002

References

Further reading

External links

 

Hemerobiiformia
Articles created by Qbugbot